T. V. Mohammed Irshad (born 26 December 1994) is an Indian professional footballer who plays as a midfielder for Indian Super League club NorthEast United.

Career
Born in Tirur, Kerala, Irshad began his career with the Viva Kerala youth teams until the club shut down. He then joined the Tirur Sports Academy in his home town before joining the youth team at I-League 2nd Division side DSK Shivajians in July 2013. In 2015, Irshad was part of the Maharashtra side that participated in the 2015 National Games of India. Playing as a striker, Irshad finished the tournament as the top scorer with 6 goals.

DSK Shivajians
After his performance during the 2015 National Games of India, Irshad made his professional debut for DSK Shivajians in the I-League on 26 February 2016 against Shillong Lajong. He came on as an 87th-minute substitute for Aser Pierrick Dipanda as DSK Shivajians drew the match 1–1.

Services
After not finding playing time with DSK Shivajians, Irshad joined Services football side for the 2016–17 Santosh Trophy. He played in the team's first match of the tournament against Meghalaya but couldn't prevent the side from losing 2–0.

Gokulam Kerala
After playing for Services, Irshad signed for I-League side Gokulam Kerala. He made his competitive debut for the club in their opening match against Shillong Lajong on 27 November 2017. He started the match as a center back as Gokulam Kerala lost 1–0. During the season, Irshad played multiple positions, including midfielder and wing-back.

On 8 September 2018, it was announced that Irshad had left Gokulam Kerala to sign with Minerva Punjab. However, after suffering an injury in pre-season and being unable to find time on the pitch when he returned, Irshad returned to Gokulam Kerala. On 24 August 2019, Irshad was part of the Gokulam Kerala side that won the 2019 Durand Cup final against Mohun Bagan. The side defeated Mohun Bagan 2–1 as Irshad won his first career trophy.

NorthEast United
On 15 September 2021, NorthEast United announced that they had completed the signing of Mohammad Irshad on a three-year deal. He played as a midfielder for NorthEast United. He scored his first-ever goal in Indian Super League and for the club against Mumbai City on 25 January 2022, coming on as a 73rd minute substitute for Sehnaj Singh and the match ended 1–1 draw. Irshad scored his second goal for the club against Kerala Blasters on 4 February, which ended in a 1–2 defeat for NorthEast United.

Career statistics

Club

Honours
Gokulam Kerala
 Durand Cup: 2019

References

1994 births
Living people
People from Malappuram district
Indian footballers
Chirag United Club Kerala players
DSK Shivajians FC players
Gokulam Kerala FC players
RoundGlass Punjab FC players
East Bengal Club players
NorthEast United FC players
Association football defenders
Footballers from Kerala
I-League players
Maharashtra football team players